Vyacheslav Samoylenko (born 8 September 1992 in Kirovohrad, Ukraine) is a Ukrainian football midfielder who plays for Hapoel Jerusalem F.C. in the Liga Leumit.

Samoylenko is a product of the Youth Sportive School Kirovohrad and UFK Kharkiv. His first trainer was Vitaliy Dyadenko.

He spent majority of his career in the Ukrainian First League.

References

External links 

Profile at FFU Official Site (Ukr)

1992 births
Living people
Ukrainian footballers
Association football midfielders
FC Zirka Kropyvnytskyi players
FC Krymteplytsia Molodizhne players
FC Bukovyna Chernivtsi players
Hapoel Jerusalem F.C. players
Liga Leumit players
Ukrainian expatriate footballers
Expatriate footballers in Israel
Ukrainian expatriate sportspeople in Israel
Kharkiv State College of Physical Culture 1 alumni